This was the first edition of the tournament.

Aliona Bolsova and Katarina Zavatska won the title after Ángela Fita Boluda and Guiomar Maristany retired at 1–2 in the final.

Seeds

Draw

Draw

References

External Links
Main Draw

Open Internacional de San Sebastián - Doubles